The sistil is a South American lute with twelve strings in six courses and a scale length intermediate between a guitar and a mandolin.

References 

Necked lutes